Luis Damón is an American singer. In 1996 released his debut album titled Solo (Alone) and was nominated the following year for a Lo Nuestro Award for Tropical New Artist of the Year. In 1998, Damón recorded a duet with Puerto-Rican American singer Olga Tañón, "Para Estar Contigo" ("To be With You"), which peaked at number 30 in the Billboard Latin Songs chart.

References

Living people
Singers from New York (state)
American male singers
American salsa musicians
American musicians of Puerto Rican descent
Year of birth missing (living people)